Xylan 1,3-beta-xylosidase (1,3-beta-D-xylosidase, exo-1,3-beta-xylosidase, beta-1,3'-xylanase, exo-beta-1,3'-xylanase, 1,3-beta-D-xylan xylohydrolase) is an enzyme with systematic name 3-beta-D-xylan xylohydrolase. This enzyme catalyses the following chemical reaction

 Hydrolysis of successive xylose residues from the non-reducing termini of (1->3)-beta-D-xylans

References

External links 
 

EC 3.2.1